Pontastacus pachypus, the Caspian crayfish is a species of crayfish found in the Caspian Sea, the Don river, and parts of the Black Sea and Sea of Azov,  where it lives in salinities of up to 14‰. It is listed as Data Deficient in the IUCN Red List.

References

Astacidae
Freshwater crustaceans of Europe
Freshwater crustaceans of Asia
Crustaceans described in 1837
Taxobox binomials not recognized by IUCN